The Royal Canal is a canal originally built for freight and passenger transportation from Dublin to Longford in Ireland. It is one of two canals from Dublin to the River Shannon and was built in direct competition to the Grand Canal. The canal fell into disrepair in the late 20th century, but much of it has since been restored for navigation. The length of the canal to the River Shannon was reopened on 1 October 2010, but a final spur branch, to Longford Town, remains closed.

History

Construction

In 1755, Thomas Williams and John Cooley made a survey to find a suitable route for a man-made waterway across north Leinster from Dublin to the Shannon. They originally planned to use a series of rivers and lakes, including the Boyne, Blackwater, Deel, Yellow, Camlin and Inny and Lough Derravaragh. A disgruntled director of the Grand Canal Company sought support to build a canal from Dublin to Cloondara, on the Shannon in West County Longford.

Work on this massive project commenced in May 1790 at Cross Guns Bridge, Phibsborough in a westerly direction towards Ashtown. This is commemorated in the plaque beneath the keystone of Ranelagh Bridge. Twenty-seven years later, in 1817, the canal reached the Shannon. The total cost of construction was £1,421,954. Building was unexpectedly expensive and the project was riven with problems; in 1794 the Royal Canal Company was declared bankrupt. The Duke of Leinster, a board member, insisted that the new waterway take in his local town of Maynooth. The builders had to deviate from the planned route and necessitated the construction of a 'deep sinking' between Blanchardstown and Clonsilla. The diversion also called for the building of the Ryewater Aqueduct, at Leixlip.

Operation

The original 1796 fare from Dublin to Kilcock was 1/1, much cheaper than the stagecoach.

By the 1830s the canal carried 80,000 tons of freight and 40,000 passengers a year.
 In 1843, while walking with his wife along the Royal Canal, Sir William Rowan Hamilton realised the formula for quaternions and carved his initial thoughts into a stone on the Broom Bridge over the canal. The annual Hamilton Walk commemorates this event. In 1845 the canal was bought by the Midland Great Western Railway Company. They considered draining the canal and building a new railway along its bed but decided instead to build the railway beside the canal. The two run side by side from Dublin to Mullingar.

In May 1847, during the Great Famine, tenants of Major Denis Mahon, left his Strokestown Park estate in County Roscommon. The tenants, who would become known locally as the "Missing 1,490", had been offered a choice of emigration with assisted passage, starvation on their blighted potato farms or a place in the local workhouse. Weakened by starvation, the 1,490 walked for days along the towpaths of the Royal Canal to Dublin, where they were put on boats to Liverpool, and from there travelled to Grosse Île, Quebec on four "coffin ships" – cargo vessels that were also, ironically, loaded with grain from Ireland, and were unsuitable for passengers. It is estimated that half of the emigrants died before reaching Grosse Île. This was the largest single exodus of tenants during the Famine. Mahon was assassinated in November 1847, after news reached Roscommon about the fate of his former tenants. An annual walk on the canal banks commemorates these events.

Competition from the railways gradually eroded the canal's business and by the 1880s annual tonnage was down to about 30,000 and the passenger traffic had all but disappeared.

It had a brief resurgence during World War II, when horses and barges returned to the canal. CIÉ took over the canal in 1944. As rail and road traffic increased, the canal fell into disuse. In 1974, volunteers from the Inland Waterways Association of Ireland formed the Royal Canal Amenity Group to save the canal. By 1990 they had 74 kilometres of canal, from the 12th lock in Blanchardstown to Mullingar, open again for navigation. In 2000, the canal was taken over by Waterways Ireland, a cross-border body charged with administering Ireland's inland navigations. On 1 October 2010, the whole length of the canal was formally reopened.

Management

Since the early 19th century, the canal has been maintained by eight successive agencies: the Royal Canal Company, the Commissioners of Inland Navigation, the New Royal Canal Company, Midland Great Western Railway Company, Great Southern Railways, CIÉ, (from 1986) the Office of Public Works, and Waterways Ireland, in addition to the restoration and maintenance by the volunteers of the Royal Canal Amenity Group.

Route
The canal passes through Maynooth, Kilcock, Enfield, Longwood, Mullingar and Ballymahon has a spur to Longford. There is one main feeder (from Lough Owel), which enters the canal at Mullingar.

Transport links 

The Royal Canal was originally planned to terminate in Dublin at Broadstone, to serve the then fashionable area of residence, as well as King's Inns and the nearby markets, but it was extended so that now, at the Dublin end, the canal reaches the Liffey through a wide sequence of dock and locks at Spencer Dock, with a final sea lock to manage access to the river and sea.

The Dublin – Mullingar railway line was built alongside the canal for much of its length. The meandering route of the canal resulted in many speed-limiting curves on the railway. The canal was bought by the Midland Great Western Railway to provide a route to the West of Ireland, the original plan being to close the canal and build the railway along its bed.

The canal travels across one of the major junctions on the M50 where it meets the N3, in a specially constructed aqueduct.

Present day 

Today Waterways Ireland is responsible for the canal, and it was under their stewardship, in association with the Royal Canal Amenity Group, that the Royal Canal was officially reopened from Dublin to the Shannon on 2 October 2010. Access points currently exist near Leixlip and at Maynooth, Enfield, Thomastown, Mullingar, Ballinea Bridge and Ballynacargy.

In 2006, a commemoration marker was erected at Piper's Boreen, Mullingar, to mark the 200 years since the canal reached Mullingar in 1806.

Royal Canal Way

It is typically completed in three days. It is designated as a National Waymarked Trail by the National Trails Office of the Irish Sports Council and is managed by Waterways Ireland. In 2015, Dublin City Council began extending the walking and cycling route along the Royal Canal from Ashtown to Sheriff Street Upper. The Royal Canal Way connects with the Westmeath Way west of Mullingar, and will eventually form the eastern end of the Dublin-Galway Greenway, the final part of EuroVelo Route 2, a cycling path from Moscow across Europe to Galway.

The Royal Canal Greenway is the greenway encompassing the Royal Canal Way between Maynooth and Cloondara, with a branch to Longford. It was launched in March 2021.

Popular culture

The Auld Triangle 
The Royal Canal was immortalised in verse by Brendan Behan in The Auld Triangle. A monument featuring Behan sitting on a bench was erected on the canal bank at Binn's Bridge in Drumcondra in 2004.

And the auld triangle went jingle jangle,
All along the banks of the Royal Canal.

Superstition 
Royal Canal boatmen believed the 13th lock at Deey Bridge, between Leixlip and Maynooth, was haunted. This tale became the subject of a poem by Arthur Griffith, The Spooks of the Thirteenth Lock, which in turn inspired the name of the band The Spook of the Thirteenth Lock.

Gallery of Locks from the Liffey to the Shannon

See also
EuroVelo
List of bridges over the Royal Canal in Greater Dublin
Canals of Ireland
Rivers of Ireland
Transport in Ireland

References

External links

 IWAI – Guide to the Royal Canal of Ireland
 Bond Bridge, Maynooth
 The Royal Canal(Longford Branch)
 Royal Canal Amenity Group
 Royal Canal Walk
 Broadstone station history
 Broadstone line walk

Canals in Ireland
Inland waterways under restoration
Transport in Fingal
Transport in County Kildare
Transport in County Meath
Transport in County Westmeath
Transport in County Longford
Dublin-Galway Greenway
Canals opened in 1817
1817 establishments in Ireland
Transport in Dublin (city)